Oryol was a wooden-hulled, steam-powered, 84-gun third-rate ship of the line built for the Imperial Russian Navy in the 1850s. She was begun as a sailing ship, but was converted to steam power while under construction. The ship served with the Baltic Fleet until she was stricken from the Navy List in 1863.

Description, construction and career
The ship displaced  and measured 2,386 tons bm. She was equipped with a Russian-built Baird steam engine of 450 nominal horsepower that drove a single propeller shaft.

All of Oryols guns were smoothbores and they consisted of two 68-pounder guns on pivot mounts as chase guns on the forecastle and quarterdeck as well as four short 24-pounder guns and sixteen 24-pounder carronades. On her upper deck the ship carried four long 24-pounders, 24 short 24-pounder guns and four 60-pounder licornes. The armament of her lower deck consisted of twenty-eight 68-pounders and four long 24-pounder guns.

Oryol was launched on 12 August 1854 made her first cruise with the Baltic Fleet in 1856. She was placed in reserve until 1859–60 when she next cruised the Baltic Sea. The ship was afterwards placed in reserve again until she was stricken on 7 December 1863.

Notes

Citations

References

Naval ships of Russia
1854 ships
Ships of the line of the Imperial Russian Navy